The Broken Anchor is the 70th book in the Nancy Drew Stories series. It was originally published in 1983 under the Wanderer imprint of Simon and Schuster.

Plot summary 

Nancy receives a mysterious letter claiming she has won a week-long holiday for two at the Sweet Springs Resort on Anchor Island in the Bahamas. Nancy is puzzled because she never entered any contest. The enclosed plane tickets are for the next day, so she sends her friends Bess and George to go to the resort, and she and her dad will follow later. After Bess and George have left for Anchor Island, she and her dad, Carson Drew, go down to Miami to investigate a mysterious ship. It has been linked to them as it contains newspaper clippings on some of Nancy's recent adventures. The boat is owned by Jeff and Lena DeFoe, who Nancy finds out are the owners of the Sweet Springs resort. While searching the boat for any evidence, Nancy loses her earring and while trying to find it uncovers an old medallion. Her father takes it to Avery Yates, an antique jewelry restorer. Meanwhile, Nancy is worried because her attempts to contact Bess and George have failed.

Characters 
INA version
 Nancy Drew
 Carson Drew: Nancy's father
 Hannah Gruen: Nancy's family housekeeper
 Bess Marvin: Nancy's best friend
 George Fayne: Nancy's best friend, Bess's first cousin
 Jeff DeFoe: Sweet Spring Resorts owner
 Lena DeFoe: Jeff DeFoe's wife
 Penny DeFoe: the DeFoe's grandniece
 Sheriff Boyd: Pal Cove sheriff in charge of the investigation of the mysterious boat
 Avery Yates: Carson Drew's friend and a restorer of old jewelry
 Tom: Villain
 Jack: Villain
 Perkins: Plane passenger
 Ben Graves: Plane passenger

Artwork 
The first edition featured cover art by Ruth Sanderson and six internal illustrations by Paul Frame. It was republished again under both Wanderer and Minstrel imprints. The illustrations were removed in the final two printings.

Adaptation 
The 20th installment in the Nancy Drew point-and-click adventure game series by Her Interactive, named Nancy Drew: Ransom of the Seven Ships, is loosely based on the novel.

References

Nancy Drew books
1983 American novels
1983 children's books
Novels set in the Bahamas
Novels adapted into video games